Mulish (also Romanized as Mūlīsh and Mūyesh) is a village in Mahru Rural District, Zaz va Mahru District, Aligudarz County, Lorestan Province, Iran. At the 2006 census, its population was 61, in 13 families.

References 

Towns and villages in Aligudarz County